Jean Delemer (1410 – 1440), was a Flemish sculptor.

Biography
He was active in Tournai from 1428 to 1440 and was possibly from Valenciennes. He was probably born in the 1410s as he was paid in 1428 for carving a life-size stone Annunciation group after a painting by Robert Campin for what is now the Church of Saint Quentin in Tournai. His Annunciation group is considered the earliest example of the Late Gothic style. Besides this group, no other works by the sculptor are known.

References

1410s births
1440s deaths
Artists from Tournai
Early Netherlandish sculptors
Flemish sculptors (before 1830)